Wergaia or Werrigia is an Australian Aboriginal language in the Wimmera region of north-Western Victoria. The Wergaia language consisted of four distinct dialects: Wudjubalug/Wotjobaluk, Djadjala/Djadjali, Buibadjali, Biwadjali. Wergaia was in turn apparently a dialect of the Wemba Wemba language, a member of the Kulinic branch of Pama–Nyungan.

The Aboriginal people who speak Wergaia dialects include the Maligundidj or Wergaia people, which means the people belonging to the mali (mallee) eucalypt bushland which covers much of their territory, and the Wotjobaluk people.

In mid-2021 a language revival project started up at the Wotjobaluk Knowledge Place, established in December 2020 at Dimboola. A Wergaia language program would run over 20 weeks.

Sounds 
The following is the Djadjala dialect.

Vowels given are /a e i u/.

Some words
 dhallung (male or buck klangaroo)
 gal (dog)
 kulkun (a boy)
 laiaruk (a woman)
 lanangurk (a girl)
 mindyun (a kangaroo)
 muty (doer or female kangaroo)}
 winya nyua (Who is there?)
 wotjo (a man)

Notes and references

Notes

References

Wergaia
Kulin languages